Carrapateena Airport  is a private airport servicing the OZ Minerals Carrapateena mine in northern South Australia,  east of Woomera. Construction of the airport was completed in July 2018.

Airlines and destinations

Notes
 Fly-in fly-out (FIFO) private charter operations only.

See also
 List of airports in South Australia

References

Airports in South Australia
Far North (South Australia)